Rugao ham is a  dry-cured ham that originated in Jiangsu province, China. It dates to the Qing dynasty, and was first prepared circa 1851. Rugao ham is produced in a variety of flavors, colors and weights. The local breed of Jiangquhai pigs are typically used for the ham. In contemporary times, it is produced in Rugao, Jiangsu province, which the ham is named after. It is a well-known ham in China.

Per the Chinese calendar, Rugao ham is produced in the winter, whereby the curing process begins between November and December, and also in spring, between January and February.

See also

 List of hams

Chinese hams
 Anfu ham
 Jinhua ham
 Xuanwei ham

References

Further reading
 

Jiangsu cuisine
Ham
Nantong